Landers Peak or Lander's Peak may refer to:

Lander Peak, in the Rocky Mountains of North America
The Rocky Mountains, Lander's Peak, 1863 painting by Albert Bierstadt
Landers Peaks, a group of peaks in Antarctica

See also
Landers (disambiguation)
Lander (disambiguation)